Michał Marusik (26 September 1951 — 18 December 2020) was a Polish politician who was leader of the Congress of the New Right (KNP) from 2015 to 2017. He was a Congress of the New Right Member of the European Parliament representing Warsaw from 2014-2019.

On 28 January 2017, Marusik resigned as KNP leader. On the same day Stanisław Żółtek was elected to replace him.

Marusik died on 18 December 2020.

References

1951 births
2020 deaths
MEPs for Poland 2014–2019
Congress of the New Right politicians
People from Tomaszów Mazowiecki County